Ureña SC is a Venezuelan football team that is based in San Cristóbal, Venezuela with the team currently competing in the Venezuelan Segunda División.

References

Football clubs in Venezuela